This article is about the American Billboard Hot 100 chart held during the 2020s.

The Billboard Hot 100 is a chart that ranks the best-performing songs of the United States. Published by Billboard magazine, the data are compiled by Nielsen SoundScan based collectively on each single's weekly physical and digital sales, airplay, and, since 2012, streaming.

A new chart is compiled and officially released to the public every Tuesday in Billboard magazine and on its website. Each chart is dated with the "week-ending" date of the Saturday four days later.

Mariah Carey's "All I Want for Christmas Is You" began the 2020s in the number-one position on the Hot 100, and made her the first artist to rank at number one on charts from four different decades. The song was in its third week at number one on January 4, 2020, reaching the top for the first time on December 21, 2019. The following week, on January 11, 2020, Post Malone's "Circles" returned to the number-one spot, another carry-over from the 2010s; it originally reached number one on November 30, 2019.

Number-one singles

Key

 * (asterisk) – the current number one
 – Number-one single of the year
Note: The best-performing single on the Billboard Hot 100 of 2021 was Dua Lipa's "Levitating", which peaked at number two, and thus is excluded here.

Note
 Across four separate holiday season runs (2019–2022), "All I Want for Christmas Is You" has accumulated 12 total weeks at number one. It is also the first song in the history of the Hot 100 to reach number one in at least three separate chart runs.

Statistics

Artists by total number-one singles

The following artists achieved two or more number-one singles during the 2020s. A number of artists had number-one singles on their own as well as part of a collaboration. An asterisk (*) denotes that an artist is currently at number one.

Artists by total cumulative weeks at number one

The following artists were featured at the top of the Hot 100 for the highest cumulative number of weeks during the 2020s. Some totals include in part or in whole weeks spent at number one as part of a collaboration. An asterisk (*) denotes that an artist is currently at number one.

Songs by total number of weeks at number one

The following songs were featured at the top of the Hot 100 for the highest number of weeks during the 2020s. An asterisk (*) denotes that a song is currently at number one.

See also
 List of Billboard number-one singles
 2020s in music
 List of UK Singles Chart number ones of the 2020s

References 

 2020s
United States Hot 100